Torsten Görlitzer (born 9 January 1964) is a German luger. He competed in the men's singles event at the 1984 Winter Olympics.

References

External links
 

1964 births
Living people
German male lugers
Olympic lugers of East Germany
Lugers at the 1984 Winter Olympics
People from Erzgebirgskreis
Sportspeople from Saxony